Movila is a commune located in Ialomița County, Muntenia, Romania. It is composed of a single village, Movila.

References

Communes in Ialomița County
Localities in Muntenia